This is a list of opinions written by Peter Cory, during his time as a Puisne Justice of the Supreme Court of Canada between 1 February 1989 and 1 June 1999.

1989–1999
 R. v. Storrey, [1990] 1 S.C.R. 241
 R. v. Askov, [1990] 2 S.C.R. 1199
 R. v. McCraw, [1991] 3 S.C.R. 72
 Canadian Council of Churches v. Canada (Minister of Employment and Immigration), [1992] 1 S.C.R. 236
 Rodriguez v. British Columbia (Attorney General) [1993] (dissent)
 R. v. Daviault, [1994] 3 S.C.R. 63
 R. v. Heywood, 1994
 R. v. Stillman, [1997] 1 S.C.R. 607
 Vriend v. Alberta, [1998] 1 S.C.R. 493 (with Iacobucci)
 Dobson (Litigation Guardian of) v. Dobson, [1999] 2 S.C.R. 753

 Note: This list is incomplete

Cory